Albert P. Blakeslee was a Democratic member of the Wisconsin State Assembly during the 1st Wisconsin Legislature's 1848 session. Blakeslee represented the 3rd District of Rock County, Wisconsin. He was succeeded by Lucius H. Page, a Whig.

References

People from Rock County, Wisconsin
Year of birth missing
Year of death missing
Democratic Party members of the Wisconsin State Assembly